Lajamanu Teenage Band are a rock band from Lajamanu, a town located about 600 km to the north of Yuendumu. The members are Warlpiri and their songs are sung in Warlpiri and English. They are popular in the Aboriginal communities. Their album Vision was nominated for an ARIA Award for Best World Music Album.

Discography

Albums

Awards and nominations

ARIA Music Awards
The ARIA Music Awards is an annual awards ceremony that recognises excellence, innovation, and achievement across all genres of Australian music. They commenced in 1987.

! 
|-
| 1999
| Vision
| Best World Music Album
| 
| 
|-

National Indigenous Music Awards
The National Indigenous Music Awards (NIMA) (formally NT Indigenous Music Awards) recognise excellence, dedication, innovation and outstanding contribution to the Northern Territory music industry. It commenced in 2004.

! 
|-
! scope="row" rowspan="1"| 2012
| Lajamanu Teenage Band
| Hall of Fame
| 
| 
|-

References 

Northern Territory musical groups
Indigenous Australian musical groups
Warlpiri